Internal Affairs is the solo debut from former Organized Konfusion member Pharoahe Monch, released on Rawkus Records and Priority Records. Monch creates a harder sound than heard on the previous Organized Konfusion records. The album spawned the Hot 100 hit "Simon Says".

The album is out of print because of Pharoahe Monch's refusal to record for the Geffen Records label after Universal Music Group acquired Rawkus Records from Priority. Rawkus, as well as its then-parent label MCA Records, were later folded by the Universal Music Group into Geffen Records.

To commemorate the album's 20th anniversary, it was reissued on October 19, 2019, becoming available digitally and on streaming services for the first time. A limited edition vinyl release was also released on June 5, 2020.

Track listing

Sample credits
 "Intro" contains samples of "Blues and The Abstract Truth" by Oliver Nelson.
 "Behind Closed Doors" contains samples of "Aftermath" by Quincy Jones.
 "Queens" contains samples of "Til the Cops Come Knockin" by Maxwell.
 "Rape" contains samples of "Candy Man" by Quincy Jones.
 "Simon Says" and "Simon Says (remix)" contains samples of "Godzilla vs. Mothra - Main Title" by Akira Ifukube.
 "No Mercy" contains samples of "The Trap" by Jerry Goldsmith.
 "The Next Shit" contains samples of "Espani Cani" by Sid Bass.
 "The Light" contains samples of "Mi Cosa" by Wes Montgomery, and "Summer Wishes, Winter Dreams" by George Benson.
 "God Send" contains samples of "Iggin Me" by Chico DeBarge , and "Excentrifugal Forz" by Frank Zappa .
 "The Truth" contains samples of "Cristo Redentor" by Harvey Mandel.

Music videos
"Simon Says" (1999, director: Busta Rhymes)
"The Light" (2000, director: Jeff Richter)

Chart positions

Album

Singles

References

1999 debut albums
Pharoahe Monch albums
Rawkus Records albums
Albums produced by Diamond D
Albums produced by DJ Scratch
Albums produced by the Alchemist (musician)